Trespass is a Scottish privately owned international sportswear brand, specialising in skiwear, waterproof jackets, fleece, festival accessories, walking boots and camping gear. The company sells outdoor clothing in the wholesale market, through retail shops in Ireland, the UK and mainland Europe, and through its website. Trespass's clothing, accessories, and gear range from entry level to more advanced.

History
Jacobs & Turner Ltd., Trespass' parent company, was established in 1938 and, at the time, specialized in technical workwear. The subsidiary brand Trespass was created in 1984, moving the company towards specialising in performance skiwear and outdoor clothing. Since its inception, the company has been located in Glasgow, Scotland, with its main head office and distribution centre still residing in the south side of the city.

Stores
After moving into the retail trade in the 1990s, Trespass expanded its business within Great Britain. It expanded into the Republic of Ireland in 2008, mainland Europe in 2014, and Northern Ireland in 2015. Its 200th UK store was opened in 2018.

The company has over 300 shops, in Ireland, Great Britain, the Netherlands, Poland, France, Germany and Austria, and has operations in 62 countries worldwide. It also sells via its website.

Partnership with Glasgow 2014 Commonwealth Games
In February 2013 it was announced that Trespass were the Official Uniform Providers for the Glasgow 2014 Commonwealth Games. Trespass supplied the uniforms for the Queen's Baton Relay and the Games Workforce, estimated at 15,000 volunteers. On 18 August 2013 the Trespass designed uniforms were unveiled, alongside the Relay baton.

Sponsorship
Trespass sponsors a number of sporting events and athletes. These include:

 Great Britain children's ski team and ski academy
 P1 Motorsports Team
 British Universities & Colleges team (BUCS) at the World University Winter Games
 Royal Caledonian Curling Club

References

Clothing companies of Scotland
Outdoor clothing brands
Companies based in Glasgow
Clothing companies established in 1984
1984 establishments in Scotland
Scottish brands
Clothing companies of the United Kingdom
1984 establishments in the United Kingdom